Matt Farniok (born September 26, 1997) is an American football center for the Dallas Cowboys of the National Football League (NFL). He was drafted by the Cowboys in the seventh round of the 2021 NFL Draft. He played college football at Nebraska.

Early years
Farniok attended Washington High School. As a sophomore, he became a starter at the offensive line. As a junior, he received Class 11AAA All-state and Sioux Falls Argus Leader's Elite 45 honors.

As a senior in 2015, he contributed to the team winning the state title. He received South Dakota Gatorade Player of the Year, first-team Parade All-American, Class 11AAA All-state and Sioux Falls Argus Leader's Elite 45 honors.

Farniok was ranked as a threestar recruit by 247Sports.com coming out of high school. He committed to Nebraska on January 27, 2016.

College career
As a redshirt freshman, he appeared in 7 games with 4 starts. He had 2 starts at right tackle and 2 starts at right guard.

As a sophomore, he was named the starter at right tackle, contributing to the team averaging 456.2 yards of total offense. As a junior, he started all 12 games at right tackle.

As a senior in 2020, the football season was reduced to 8 games due to the COVID-19 pandemic. He became one of 13 two-time captains in school history, while starting all 8 games on the offensive line. He started 7 contests at right guard and one contest at center.

Professional career
Farniok was selected by the Dallas Cowboys in the seventh round (238th overall) of the 2021 NFL Draft. He signed a four-year rookie contract on May 13, 2021.

On October 26, 2022, Farniok was placed on injured reserve.

Personal life
Farniok has three brothers who all played football at the NCAA Division I level, Derek, Tom, and Will.

References

External links
Dallas Cowboys bio
Nebraska Cornhuskers bio

1997 births
Living people
Players of American football from South Dakota
Sportspeople from Sioux Falls, South Dakota
American football offensive linemen
Nebraska Cornhuskers football players
Dallas Cowboys players